The One Hundred Tenth Ohio General Assembly was the legislative body of the state of Ohio in 1973 and 1974. In this General Assembly, the Ohio Senate was controlled by the Republican Party and the Ohio House of Representatives was controlled by the Democratic Party.  In the Senate, there were 17 Republicans and 16 Democrats.  In the House, there were 59 Democrats and 40 Republicans.  This was the first Ohio General Assembly to use redistricted legislative districts from the 1970 United States Census.

Major events

Vacancies
January 3, 1973: Senator Ralph Regula (R-29th) resigns to take a seat in the United States House of Representatives.
December 31, 1973: Senator Robert Stockdale (R-31st) resigns due to health problems.
December 6, 1974: Senator Ron Mottl (D-23rd) resigns to take a seat in the United States House of Representatives.

Appointments
January 3, 1973: Richard Reichel is appointed to the 29th Senatorial District.
January 31, 1973: Charles Bolton is appointed to the 31 Senatorial District.

Senate

Leadership

Majority leadership
 President of the Senate: John W. Brown
 President pro tempore of the Senate: Theodore Gray
 Assistant pro tempore: Michael Maloney

Minority leadership
 Leader: Anthony Calabrese
 Assistant Leader: Oliver Ocasek

Members of the 110th Ohio Senate

Members of the 110th Ohio House of Representatives

Appt.- Member was appointed to current House Seat

See also
Ohio House of Representatives membership, 126th General Assembly
Ohio House of Representatives membership, 125th General Assembly
 List of Ohio state legislatures

References
Ohio House of Representatives official website
Project Vote Smart – State House of Ohio
Map of Ohio House Districts
Ohio District Maps 2002–2012
2006 election results from Ohio Secretary of State

Ohio legislative sessions
Ohio
Ohio
1973 in Ohio
1974 in Ohio
de:Repräsentantenhaus von Ohio